Tobique—Mactaquac  is a federal electoral district in New Brunswick, Canada, that has been represented in the House of Commons of Canada since 1997.

Political geography
The district includes the counties of Carleton and Victoria as well as the Parish and Village of Saint-André and the eastern part of the County of York (excluding the City of Fredericton and vicinity). The neighbouring ridings are Madawaska—Restigouche, Miramichi, Fredericton, and New Brunswick Southwest. Across the border to Maine, it neighbours the Maine District 2 of the United States House of Representatives.

The electoral district was created in 1996 from portions of the old ridings of Carleton—Charlotte, Fredericton—York—Sunbury, and Madawaska—Victoria. Its creation was very controversial, as it included areas with both large anglophone and francophone populations, while neighbouring communities were placed in other ridings. This seemingly went against the "communities of interest" criterion in drawing electoral boundaries.

As per the 2012 federal electoral distribution, this riding will gain territory from Fredericton and lose a small territory to the new riding of Miramichi—Grand Lake.

History

On two separate occasions Tobique—Mactaquac has been involved in party nomination controversies. In the 1997 election, the Liberals were alleged to have rigged their meeting to choose Pierrette Ringuette, the Member of Parliament for the defunct Madawaska—Victoria riding. The meeting was held in Grand Falls, near her hometown and at the far northern end of the riding. Because of sound problems, only her speech was carried over the loudspeakers. Ringuette-Maltais lost the election to Gilles Bernier of the Progressive Conservatives.

In the 2004 election, the Conservative Party selected Adam Richardson, who had run for the Canadian Alliance in the 2000 election, but the national head office refused to sign his nomination papers, apparently because of Richardson's demands that party leader Stephen Harper apologize for allegedly derogatory comments about Atlantic Canadians. The eventual Conservative candidate, Mike Allen, lost to Liberal incumbent Andy Savoy.

Members of Parliament
This riding has elected the following Members of Parliament:

Election results

Tobique—Mactaquac, 2013 Representation Order

This riding gained territory from Fredericton and lost territory to Miramichi—Grand Lake for the 42nd Canadian federal election.

Tobique—Mactaquac, 2003 Representation Order

Tobique—Mactaquac, 1996 Representation Order

See also
 List of Canadian federal electoral districts
 Past Canadian electoral districts

References

Notes

External links
Riding history from the Library of Parliament

New Brunswick federal electoral districts
Grand Falls, New Brunswick
Politics of Fredericton
Woodstock, New Brunswick